Lycée Paul Valéry may refer to the following schools:
 Lycée Paul Valéry (FR) in Paris
 Lycée Français Paul Valéry de Cali in Cali, Colombia
 Lycée Paul Valéry in Meknès, Morocco